Albert Preuß (born 29 January 1864, date of death unknown) was a German sport shooter who competed in the 1912 Summer Olympics.

He won the bronze medal in the clay pigeons team event. He also competed in the running deer, single shots event and finished 23rd. In the running deer, double shots event he finished 17th and in the trap competition he finished 4th.

References

External links

1864 births
Year of death missing
German male sport shooters
Shooters at the 1912 Summer Olympics
Olympic shooters of Germany
Olympic bronze medalists for Germany
Olympic medalists in shooting
Medalists at the 1912 Summer Olympics
19th-century German people
20th-century German people